This article lists the results for the China women's national football team between 1986 and 1989.

1986

1987

1988

1989

References

1986–1989
1980s in China
1986 in Chinese football
1987 in Chinese football
1988 in Chinese football
1989 in Chinese football